Volgodonskoy District is an administrative and municipal district (raion), one of the forty-three in Rostov Oblast, Russia. It is located in the eastern central part of the oblast. Its administrative center is the rural locality (a stanitsa) of Romanovskaya. Population: 33,779 (2010 Census);  The population of Romanovskaya accounts for 24.4% of the district's total population.

Notable residents 

Nikandr Chibisov (1892–1959), Soviet military commander and Hero of the Soviet Union, born in the stanitsa of Romanovskaya
Yefim Trotsenko (1901–1972), Soviet military leader, born in Yegorov

References

Notes

Sources

Districts of Rostov Oblast